Sarvagunakar Srimanta Sankardeva is an Indian Assamese language 2D Computer animation biographical film directed by Manju Borah , Director of Animation and all animation work was single-handedly done by Dr. Gautam k. Das at "24 illusion factory", animation studio, Guwahati, and produced by Sanjive Narain under the banner of AM Television. This is a story about the life of Assam's Great saint Srimanta Sankardeva. This is the first Assamese-language animated film.

Cast

 Ranjan Bezbaruah as Srimanta Sankardeva
 Rajiv Bhattacharjya as Madhabdev
 Upakul Bordoloi
 Moni Bordoloi
 Lakshi Borthakur
 Tarali Sarma
 Arpana Dutta Choudhury
 Pratibha Choudhury
 Ujjal Khanikar
 Amitav Rajkhowa
 Satyen Sarma
 Bibhuti Hazarika

References

Indian animated films
Films directed by Manju Borah
2010s Assamese-language films
Indian biographical drama films
2016 biographical drama films
Ekasarana Dharma